The inauguration of Jimmy Carter as the 39th president of the United States was held on Thursday, January 20, 1977, at the East Portico of the United States Capitol in Washington D.C. This was the 48th inauguration and marked the commencement of Jimmy Carter's and Walter Mondale's single term as president and vice president. Chief Justice Warren E. Burger administered the presidential oath of office to Carter, and Speaker of the House Tip O'Neill administered the vice presidential oath of office to Mondale. This was the last inauguration held on the East Portico of the Capitol building as well as the last time the chief justice would stand to the left of the podium, with the audience facing them, while swearing in a president. Exactly forty years later, Carter attended the inauguration of Donald Trump, becoming the first U.S. president to mark the 40th anniversary of his inauguration.

Inaugural ceremonies
Carter took the Oath with a Family Bible, opened to Micah 6:8 and also the same Bible used by George Washington at his 1789 inauguration. The Bible that originally belonged to Washington was at the time in the possession of St. John's Mason Lodge No. 1. The weather was cold, but sunny, with a wind chill factor in the teens.

Carter's inaugural address was 1,228 words long. In it, he spoke of bringing "a new spirit among us all", and urged Americans to "reject the prospect of failure or mediocrity". He also expressed his desire that someday "the nations of the world might say that we had built a lasting peace, built not on weapons of war but on international policies which reflect our own most precious values".

Following the swearing-in ceremony, Carter became the first president to walk from the Capitol to the White House in the post-ceremony parade. Carter also requested that the traditional Inaugural luncheon, an event hosted by the Joint Congressional Inaugural Committee, be canceled. Coverage of the event was provided by CBS and the ceremony was televised throughout the United States.

The Carter Inauguration was the first following the opening of the Metro system and, in part because the inaugural committee paid to make the system free all day, it set a single day ridership record of 68,023 riders, a record that would last until the system was expanded the following July.

Music
Songs performed at Carter's inauguration included Willie Nelson's "Crazy," sung by Linda Ronstadt; Irving Berlin's "God Bless America," sung by Aretha Franklin; "Take Care of This House" from the Broadway musical 1600 Pennsylvania Avenue by Leonard Bernstein and Alan Jay Lerner, performed by Frederica von Stade and the National Symphony Orchestra; and "Bess, You Is My Woman Now" from George Gershwin's Porgy and Bess (lyrics by DuBose Heyward), sung by Donnie Ray Albert and Clamma Dale. Additionally, America the Beautiful was performed by the United States Marine Band, and the Battle Hymn of the Republic was sung by selected voices from Atlanta University, Clark, Morehouse, Morris Brown, and Spelman Colleges, and the Interdenominational Theological Center. The national anthem was performed by Cantor Isaac Goodfriend of Atlanta, a Holocaust survivor.

See also
Presidential transition of Jimmy Carter
Timeline of the Jimmy Carter presidency (1977)
1976 United States presidential election
Jimmy Carter 1976 presidential campaign

References

External links

Video of Carter's Inaugural Address from hulu.com (with audio)
Text of Carter's Inaugural Address
Audio of Carter's Inaugural Address

1977 in Washington, D.C.
1977 in American politics
United States presidential inaugurations
Inauguration
January 1977 events in the United States
1977 speeches